The House of Hügel is a German noble family originating from Württemberg. In 1801 the family was raised to the hereditary rank of Imperial Baron by Francis II, Holy Roman Emperor, while on 13 June 1879 the family was raised to the hereditary title of Count in the Kingdom of Württemberg by King Charles I.

Notable members 
  (1803–1865), German army officer and chamberlain, owner of 
 Baron Charles von Hügel (1795–1870), Austrian army officer, diplomat, botanist, and explorer
 Baron Friedrich von Hügel (1852–1925), Austrian Roman Catholic layman and religious writer, son of Charles
 Baron Anatole von Hügel (1854–1928), co-founder St Edmund's College in Cambridge, son of Charles
 Baroness Pauline von Hügel (1858–1901), Austrian-British religious writer, daughter of Charles
 Paul, Count von Hügel (1835-1897).
 Princess Amalie of Teck, wife Paul, Count von Hügel (1835–1897), owner of 
 Paul Julius, Count von Hügel (1872-1912) ⚭ Anna Pauline Homolatsch (b. 1880), divorced in 1911
 Huberta Amelia Maximilienne Pauline, Countess von Hügel (1897-1912)
 Ferdinand Paul, Count von Hügel (b. 1901)

Former properties

See also
 Hugel (disambiguation)

References

German noble families
Austrian noble families